Willie Weeks (born August 5, 1947) is an American bass guitarist. He has gained fame performing with famous musicians in a wide variety of genres. He has been one of the most in-demand session musicians throughout his career. Weeks has also gained fame touring with many of rock's heavyweights throughout his career.

Career
Weeks was born in Salemburg, North Carolina and began playing the electric bass in the early 1960s. His earliest influences were the country, pop and R&B music he heard on the radio. Weeks counts bassists Ron Carter, James Jamerson, and Ray Brown as early influences.

Weeks has worked in the studio or toured with a wide range of artists, including:

Gregg Allman, David Bowie, Clarence "Gatemouth" Brown, Roy Buchanan, Jimmy Buffett, Kevin Chalfant, Eric Clapton, Hank Crawford, Robert Cray, Pino Daniele, Bo Diddley, The Doobie Brothers, Lou Fellingham, Aretha Franklin, Vince Gill, Buddy Guy, Isaac Hayes, George Harrison, Donny Hathaway, Etta James, Billy Joel, Rickie Lee Jones, Wynonna Judd, Chaka Khan, B.B. King, Lyle Lovett, Gail Davies, David Lee Roth, Michael McDonald, Don McLean, John Mayer, John Mellencamp, Bette Midler, Randy Newman, Pino Palladino, Leon Russell, Boz Scaggs, John Scofield, Carly Simon, Soulive, Rod Stewart, The Rolling Stones, James Taylor, Richard and Linda Thompson, Joe Walsh, Steve Winwood, Bobby Womack, Stevie Wonder, Ronnie Wood and Eikichi Yazawa.

His playing on Donny Hathaway's Live (1972), including a 3½ minute bass solo on "Voices Inside (Everything Is Everything)", is regarded by many bass players as some of Weeks' best work. He played a 1962 Fender P-Bass through an Ampeg SVT amplifier on the recording (though it had initially been reported that he played through an Ampeg B-15).

Weeks' contributions to the Hathaway album impressed many English rock musicians, leading to his work with Ronnie Wood, George Harrison and David Bowie from 1974 onwards. In a press conference for his 1974 North American tour, Harrison cited Weeks' musicianship when dismissing the likelihood of a Beatles reunion, saying he would "rather have Willie Weeks on bass than Paul McCartney".

Weeks played with Ask Rufus, the precursor band to Rufus with Chaka Khan. He appeared on their recording of Al Kooper's song "Brand New Day". Weeks also played with the Fabulous Amazers and Bill Lordan (pre Robin Trower drummer) in the Minnesota group Gypsy. He also played bass guitar for Michael's Mystics back in the 1960s in Minnesota, with Lordan again on drums. That band recorded "Pain" by the Grassroots, a big hit locally for the Mystics.

He also played bass at Clapton's Crossroads Guitar Festival on July 28, 2007 at Toyota Park in Bridgeview, Illinois.

Equipment
In addition to his red 1962 Fender Precision, Weeks uses a maple-neck 1958 Precision and a 1964 Fender Jazz Bass, as well as a tobacco sunburst Kay four-string acoustic bass for Clapton's "unplugged repertoire". Weeks used a sunburst 1963 P-Bass during Clapton's 2008 European Summer tour. In 2014 he began using his "WW" Willie Weeks signature bass by Bee Basses.

On the 2009 Australasian and British tours, Weeks played Fender, Kay and Alleva Coppolo basses.  In 2017, Weeks used a custom made Alien Audio bass made by Charles "Chopper" Anderson in Nashville.

Weeks appeared in the films Blues Brothers 2000 (in a fictional supergroup along with other musicians he's worked with) and Lightning in a Bottle.

Discography
With Gypsy
 1971 In the Garden
With Donny Hathaway
 1973 Extension of a Man
With Herbie Mann
 1973 Turtle Bay 
With Stevie Wonder
 1973 Innervisions
With Gloria Jones
 1973 Share My Love
With Aretha Franklin
 1974 Let Me in Your Life
With Randy Newman
 1974 Good Old Boys
 1977 Little Criminals
 1979 Born Again
With Ronnie Wood
 1974 I've Got My Own Album to Do
 1975 Now Look
 2001 Not for Beginners
With Rod Stewart
 1974 Smiler
 1976 A Night on the Town
With George Harrison
 1974 Dark Horse
 1975 Extra Texture (Read All About It)
 1976 Thirty Three & 1/3
 1979 George Harrison
 1981 Somewhere in England
 1982 Gone Troppo
With Don McLean
 1974 Homeless Brother
With David Bowie
 1975 Young Americans
With James Taylor
 1975 Gorilla
 1976 In the Pocket
With Carly Simon
 1975 Playing Possum
With Terry Garthwaite
 1975 Terry
With Kenny Vance
 1975 Vance 32
With Al Jarreau
 1976 Glow
With Richie Havens
 1976 The End of the Beginning
With Dianne Brooks
 1976 Back Stairs of My Life
With Maria Muldaur
 1976 Sweet Harmony
With David Batteau
 1976 Happy in Hollywood
With Steve Winwood
 1977 Steve Winwood 
With Cher and Gregg Allman
 1977 Two the Hard Way
With Dan Fogelberg
 1978 Twin Sons of Different Mothers
With Joe Walsh
 1978 But Seriously, Folks...
With Rickie Lee Jones
 1979 Rickie Lee Jones
With Bette Midler
 1979 Thighs and Whispers
With Adam Mitchell
 1979 Redhead in Trouble
With Chaka Khan
 1980 Naughty
With Stephen Bishop
 1980 Red Cab to Manhattan
With Michael McDonald
 1982 If That's What It Takes
 1986 No Lookin' Back
 2017 Wide Open
With Bill LaBounty
 1982 Bill LaBounty
With John Mellencamp
 1983 Uh-huh
 1989 Big Daddy
 2001 Cuttin' Heads
With Rosanne Cash
 1985 Rhythm & Romance
With Jimmy Buffett
 1986 Floridays
With William Lee Golden
 1986 American Vagabond
With Webb Wilder
 1989 Hybrid Vigor
With Etta James
 1989 Seven Year Itch
 1992 The Right Time
With Vince Gill
 1989 When I Call Your Name
 1991 Pocket Full of Gold
 1992 I Still Believe in You
 1994 When Love Finds You
 2000 Let's Make Sure We Kiss Goodbye
 2003 Next Big Thing
 2013 Bakersfield
 2016 Down to My Last Bad Habit
With Kenny Rogers
 1989 Something Inside So Strong
 1997 Across My Heart
With Marty Balin
 1991 Better Generation
With Ronna Reeves
 1991 Only the Heart
With Joan Baez
 1992 Play Me Backwards
 1997 Gone from Danger
With Wynonna Judd
 1992 Wynonna
 1993 Tell Me Why
 1996 Revelations
 1997 The Other Side
 2000 New Day Dawning
 2003 What the World Needs Now Is Love
With John Michael Montgomery
 1992 Life's a Dance
With Tracy Lawrence
 1994 I See It Now
With Billy Burnette
 1994 Coming Home
With Chris Norman
 1994 The Album
With Rodney Crowell
 1995 Jewel of the South
With Clarence "Gatemouth" Brown
 1995 Long Way Home
With Peter Cetera
 1995 One Clear Voice
 2001 Another Perfect World
With Janis Ian
 1995 Revenge
 2000 God and the FBI
With Tanya Tucker
 1995 Fire to Fire
 2002 Tanya
With Mac Gayden
 1995 Nirvana Blues
With Russ Taff
 1995 Winds of Change
With Lisa Brokop
 1996 Lisa Brokop
With Dan Hill
 1996 I'm Doing Fine
With Lari White
 1996 Don't Fence Me In
With Anita Cochran
 1997 Back to You
With Tara Lyn Hart
 1999 Tara Lyn Hart
With Sonya Isaacs
 2000 Sonya Isaacs
With Robert Cray
 2001 Shoulda Been Home
With Hal Ketchum
 2001 Lucky Man
With Alicia Keys
 2003 The Diary of Alicia Keys
With Keb' Mo'
 2004 Keep It Simple
With Amy Grant
 2005 Rock of Ages... Hymns and Faith
With J. J. Cale and Eric Clapton
 2006 The Road to Escondido
With John Mayer
 2006 Continuum
With Eric Clapton
 2010 Clapton
 2013 Old Sock
With LeAnn Rimes
 2013 Spitfire
 2014 One Christmas: Chapter 1
 2015 Today Is Christmas
 2016 Remnants
With Boz Scaggs
 2013 Memphis
 2018 Out of the Blues
With Leon Russell
 2014 Life Journey
With John Oates
 2014 Good Road to Follow
With Colin James
 2015 Hearts on Fire
With Mark Ronson
 2015 Uptown Special
With Cyndi Lauper
 2016 Detour
With Elizabeth Cook
 2016 Exodus of Venus
With Ronnie Baker Brooks
 2017 Times Have Changed
With Gloria Gaynor
 2019 Testimony
With Wendy Moten
 2020 I've Got You Covered
With Cravity
 2020 Season 2. Hideout: The New Day We Step Into

References

External links
 Clark, Doug (January 21, 2007). "The mark of a musician". The Sampson Independent. Retrieved on August 31, 2007. 
 Johnston, Richard (August 2005). "Willie Weeks Does It All". Bass Player. Retrieved on August 31, 2007. (See web archive version)
 Guitar Player. November 1990.
 Eric Clapton's Fan Club
 Bass Player.com Willie Weeks

American country bass guitarists
American male bass guitarists
American rock bass guitarists
American session musicians
The Doobie Brothers members
1947 births
Living people
People from Sampson County, North Carolina
Guitarists from North Carolina
20th-century American bass guitarists
Gypsy (band) members
Country musicians from North Carolina
20th-century American male musicians